10 Trianguli is a solitary star located in the northern constellation Triangulum. It has an apparent magnitude of 5.28, making it faintly visible to the naked eye under ideal conditions.

10 Trianguli has a stellar classification of A2 V. It has 2.326 times the mass of the Sun and 3.651 times the radius of the Sun. It shines at 85.4 times the luminosity of the Sun from its photosphere at an effective temperature of 9183 K, giving it a blueish white glow.

Together with ι Trianguli and 12 Trianguli, it forms part of the obsolete Triangulum Minus.

References

A-type main-sequence stars
Triangulum (constellation)
Trianguli, 10
014252
010793
0675
Durchmusterung objects